Year 358 (CCCLVIII) was a common year starting on Thursday (link will display the full calendar) of the Julian calendar. At the time, it was known as the Year of the Consulship of Datianus and Cerealis (or, less frequently, year 1111 Ab urbe condita). The denomination 358 for this year has been used since the early medieval period, when the Anno Domini calendar era became the prevalent method in Europe for naming years.

Events 
 By place 

 Roman Empire 
 Emperor Constantius II builds new forts to secure upper Mesopotamia. Persia's king Shapur II sends an emissary to Constantinople with gifts and a letter wrapped in white silk. He requests that Constantius return the lands of his ancestors from the Euphrates to the frontier of Macedonia. Constantius tactfully refuses to cede any territories.
 The Salian Franks capitulate to Julian the Apostate in Gaul. He allows them to form a Roman foederati in Toxandria. Frankish settlers  are established in areas in the north and the east to help with the defense of the Rhine frontier.
 An invasion of Pannonia by the Quadi and the Sarmates is repulsed by Constantius II.
 August 24 — An earthquake destroys Nicomedia, and damages 150 cities in Macedonia, Asia and Pontus.

 By topic 

 Religion 
 Constantius II recalls Pope Liberius to Rome, where he receives a joyous welcome from the Christians. Antipope Felix II prudently retires to his estate near Porto (Portugal).
 Eudoxius becomes Patriarch of Antioch.
 The last universally binding decision, of the Great Sanhedrin, establishes a fixed Hebrew calendar.

Births 
 Aignan of Orleans, Christian bishop (d. 453)

Deaths 
 Duan, Chinese princess and wife of Murong Chui
 Paulinus of Trier, Christian bishop and saint

References